Project Runway Season 10 is the tenth season of the television show Project Runway, appearing on Lifetime. The season began airing on July 19, 2012 with 16 designers competing to become "the next great American designer."

The series began filming on June 15, 2012, launching the season with a fashion show in front of a live audience.

Returning as judges were supermodel Heidi Klum; fashion designer Michael Kors; and Marie Claire fashion director Nina Garcia. Tim Gunn returned as the workroom mentor.  This would be the final season that Michael Kors would be a full-time judge, as he later decided he wanted to spend more of his time as a fashion designer as opposed to judging Project Runway.

Lord & Taylor was the exclusive retail sponsor for Project Runway's 10th season and has merchandised the accessory wall with an assortment of products. In addition, Lord & Taylor hosted a challenge episode for the designers and for consumers on Fashion's Night Out at its flagship store on Fifth Avenue in New York City.

Melissa Fleis, Christopher Palu and Elena Slivnyak competed in Project Runway All Stars (season 3) in 2013. Melissa placed 9th, Christopher placed 4th, and Elena placed 3rd.

In 2014, Gunnar Deatherage, Fabio Costa, Sonjia Williams and Dmitry Sholokhov appeared in Project Runway All Stars (season 4). Gunnar placed 9th, Fabio placed 5th, Sonjia was the runner-up, and Dmitry won the competition.

In 2018, Melissa Fleis and Fabio Costa both once again returned to compete in Project Runway All Stars (season 6). Melissa placed 13th while Fabio was the runner-up.

In 2019, Dmitry Sholokhov returned for a third time to compete in Project Runway All Stars (season 7) alongside worldwide Project Runway winners. He was the runner-up of the season.

Contestants

Designers
Sources:

Models

 Katt Vogel
 Hannah Herreid
 Lacee Teel
 Claudia Ruff
 Alexandra Wynne
 Mayra Rosario
 Kate Wilson
 Lauren Way
 Kailah Lindsey
 Sashalee Pallagi
 Jordan Hathaway
 Sarah Goolden
 Ashley Sanee'
 Phoenix Skye
 Aubrey Wilder
 Sonika Shankar

Extra Models-Challenge 1

 Alex Spencer
 Anna Zhylyak
 Brandie Bowman
 Elaina Williams
 Iman Payne
 Jasmine Rivers
 Kyler Tate
 Priscilla Ebonae
 Sandra Woodley

Challenges

 The designer won Project Runway Season 10.
 The designer was advanced to Fashion Week.
 The designer won the challenge.
 The designer came in second but did not win the challenge.
 The designer had one of the highest scores for that challenge, but did not win.
 The designer had one of the lowest scores for that challenge, but was not eliminated.
 The designer was in the bottom two, but was not eliminated.
 The designer lost and was out of the competition.
 The designer withdrew from the competition.

: In episode 5, the 11 remaining designers were split into 2 teams: A team of 5 (Christopher, Fabio, Gunnar, Nathan, and Ven) and a team of 6 (Alicia, Dimitry, Elena, Melissa, Raul, and Sonjia) . The judges determined that the scores for both teams were equal and that there was no winning or losing team. Each individual was eligible for the win. Melissa won the challenge and although many of the designers received positive feedback, Christopher, Fabio, and Melissa were singled out by the judges as the TOP 3. Elena, Gunnar, and Raul received criticism and their scores are noted as being lower, as the Official Website Scorecard indicates them as the Bottom 3.
: In episode 7, no one was eliminated and since they were still down one designer from where they planned to be at this point they only eliminated one designer the following week. 
: The team consisting of Melissa, Fabio, and Ven were placed on the bottom. However, although the judges primarily had many problems and criticisms regarding their looks, the pieces that Melissa made were noted as being very strong, and she received positive feedback.
:There were two winners selected during this episode. Three designers designed an outfit for a baby boy, the other three designed for a baby girl. Christopher won the girl's outfit challenge and Sonjia won the boy's.

 The model wore the winning designs of Project Runway Season 10.
 The model wore the winning design that challenge.
 The model wore the losing design that challenge.
 The model was eliminated.

Episodes

Episode 1: A Times Square Anniversary Party 

Original Airdate: July 19, 2012

 Sixteen contestants arrive in New York with an outfit they designed at home that represents who they are as a designer. They are then given one day and $100 to create a complementary outfit.  Both outfits were shown in the first runway show, held outdoors in Times Square.
 Guest Judges: Patricia Field and Lauren Graham
 WINNER: Christopher
 ELIMINATED: Beatrice

Episode 2: Candy Couture 

Original Airdate: July 26, 2012

 In the Project Runway traditional "unconventional challenge," designers have to make outfits using candy from Dylan's Candy Bar.
 Guest Judge: Dylan Lauren
 WINNER: Ven
 ELIMINATED: Lantie

Episode 3: Welcome Back (or Not) to the Runway 

Original Airdate: August 2, 2012

 Given the keys to 2013 Lexus GS 350 cars by Tim Gunn, designers were paired up and tasked to create an outfit based on their car's color. Each pair designed their dresses for a client who was a notable designer from a past season. The winner of the challenge was given the privilege of attending the Emmy Awards with their winning design worn by their client.

 Guest Judge: Krysten Ritter
 WINNER: Ven
 ELIMINATED: Raul

This episode ends in a cliffhanger, as Buffi and Melissa awaken the next morning to discover that Andrea's bed is empty and she is gone.

Episode 4: Women on the Go 

Original Airdate: August 9, 2012

 This challenge was a Michael Kors challenge. They are to make an outfit for a woman who is always on the go. Andrea left in the middle of the night and Kooan decides to leave the competition during the day as a result of crumbling under the pressure.
 Guest Judges: Hayden Panettiere and Rachel Roy 
 WINNER: Sonjia
 RETURNED: Raul
 ELIMINATED: Buffi
 WITHDREW: Andrea, Kooan

Episode 5: It's My Way On the Runway 

Original Airdate: August 16, 2012
 The designers were split up into two teams to create a cohesive line of professional womenswear. The designers had until 11 P.M. to finish their looks and no time the next day because of a photoshoot.

 Note: This challenge had no winning and losing team, and any designer had the chance to be the winner.
 Guest Judge: Joanna Coles
 WINNER: Melissa
 ELIMINATED: Raul

Episode 6: Fix My Friend 

Original Airdate: August 23, 2012

 The designers were given clients that are in need of a style makeover and design outfits according to their client's preferences. Tensions ran high between Ven, his client, and his fellow peers.
 Guest Judge: Alice Temperley
 WINNER: Fabio
 ELIMINATED: Nathan

Episode 7: Oh My Lord & Taylor 

Original Airdate: August 30, 2012

Lord & Taylor launched an exclusive Project Runway capsule collection to celebrate the show's tenth season. Consisting of ten cocktail and evening dresses from throughout the program's history, this collection was to be completed by the winner of this episode's challenge. The winner's dress was produced together with the other nine dresses for sale at Lord & Taylor.
Guest Judge: Bonnie Brooks
WINNER: Christopher
ELIMINATED: None

Episode 8: Starving Artist 

Original Airdate: September 6, 2012

In a sales-based test, the designers were split into teams of three and were tasked to sell makeshift goods to people on the street and raise funds to buy fabric. Each team then had to design two looks, one of which had to be outerwear.

Guest Judge: Anna Sui
WINNER: Sonjia
ELIMINATED: Alicia

Episode 9: It's All About Me 

Original Airdate: September 13, 2012

The contestants designed their own prints that had to be featured in a modern look.
Guest Judges: Mondo Guerra and Anya Ayoung Chee
WINNER: Dmitry 
ELIMINATED: Gunnar

Episode 10: I Get a Kick Out of Fashion 
Original Airdate: September 20, 2012
The designers had to design an outfit for the Rockettes. Christopher's winning design featuring the New York skyline will be worn in a future Rockettes performance.
Guest Judge: Debra Messing
WINNER: Christopher
ELIMINATED: Ven

Episode 11: It's Fashion Baby 
Original Airdate: September 27, 2012

The designers were tasked to create looks for Heidi Klum's 'Babies R Us' collection while caring for a lifelike baby doll. They also had to create a companion outfit for the moms. There were two winners: Christopher won the best design for the girl outfits, while Sonjia won for the boy outfits.
Guest Judge: Hilary Duff
WINNER: Christopher and Sonjia
ELIMINATED: Elena

Episode 12: In a Place Far, Far Away
Original Airdate: October 4, 2012

The designers are to create avant-garde looks inspired by the new L'Oreal Paris makeup line.

Guest Judge: Zoe Saldana
WINNER: Dmitry
ELIMINATED: Sonjia

Episode 13: Finale, Part I
Original Airdate: October 11, 2012
Advanced to Fashion Week: Christopher, Dmitry, Fabio, Melissa

Episode 14: Finale, Part II
Original Airdate: October 18, 2012

Guest Judge: Jennifer Hudson
WINNER: Dmitry
ELIMINATED: Fabio, Melissa, Christopher

Footnotes

References

External links 

Season 10
2012 American television seasons
2012 in fashion